The 2018 CONCACAF Women's U-17 Championship qualification is a women's under-17 football competition which decides the participating teams of the 2018 CONCACAF Women's U-17 Championship. A total of eight teams will play in the final tournament. Players born on or after 1 January 2001 are eligible to compete in the tournament.

Teams
A total of 27 (out of 41) CONCACAF member national teams entered, with four automatic qualifiers, and the remaining 23 teams entering regional qualification tournaments.

Notes
Teams in bold qualified for the final tournament.

Central American Zone

In the Central American Zone, four UNCAF member national teams entered the qualifying competition, hosted by Panama. The four teams were placed into one group, with the winners qualifying for the final tournament as the UNCAF representatives together with Nicaragua who qualified automatically as hosts.

The schedule of the qualifying competition was announced on 26 September 2017. All times local, UTC−5.

Group stage

Goalscorers
5 goals

 Anuvis Angulo

3 goals

 Priscila Chinchilla
 María Paula Salas

2 goals

 Medolyn Guerrero

1 goal

 Daniela Contreras
 Pamela Gutiérrez
 Lesly Calderón
 Yasli Atencio
 Rosario Vargas

Caribbean Zone

In the Caribbean Zone, 19 CFU member national teams entered the qualifying competition, consisting of two stages. Apart from Haiti, which received a bye as hosts of the final round, the remaining 18 teams entered the first round, and were drawn into three groups of four teams and two groups of three teams. The winners of each group advance to the final round to join Haiti, where they are divided into two groups of three teams, with the top three teams (the two group winners which play in the final, and the winners of the third place match played between the two group runners-up) qualifying for the final tournament as the CFU representatives.

The draw of the qualifying competition was held on 6 June 2017, 10:00 UTC−4, at the CONCACAF headquarters in Miami Beach, Florida. Trinidad and Tobago, Puerto Rico, Saint Lucia, Guyana, and Saint Vincent and the Grenadines were automatically seeded in Groups A–E respectively as hosts of each first round group, while the remaining 14 teams were seeded based on the results of the previous two editions of the qualifying competition. Any of the top five-ranked teams (Haiti, Jamaica, Trinidad and Tobago, Puerto Rico, Bermuda) could not be drawn into the same group.

All times local, UTC−4.

First round

Group A

Group B

Group C

Group D

Group E

Final round

Group F

Group G

Third place match
Winner qualifies for 2018 CONCACAF Women's U-17 Championship.

Final

Qualified teams
The following eight teams qualified for the final tournament.

1 Bold indicates champions for that year. Italic indicates hosts for that year.

References

External links
Under 17s – Women, CONCACAF.com
Fútbol Femenino Sub-17, UNCAFut.com 
Women's U17, CFUfootball.org

Qualification
2018
Women's U-17 Championship qualification
2017 in women's association football
2017 in youth association football
August 2017 sports events in North America
October 2017 sports events in North America